Selasia is a genus of beetles belonging to the family Elateridae, having historically been placed in the family "Drilidae", which was recently subsumed by Elateridae.

List of species
 Selasia apicalis Pic, 1914
 Selasia arabica Geisthardt, 2003
 Selasia atriventris Pic, 1914
 Selasia boruckae Kundrata, 2012
 Selasia dembickyi Kundrata & Sormova, 2018
 Selasia homhilia Geisthardt, 2003
 Selasia isabellae Bourgeois, 1909
 Selasia ivanae Packova & Kundrata, 2021
 Selasia jenisi Kundrata & Sormova, 2018
 Selasia merkli Kundrata, 2012
 Selasia nigrobrunnea Kundrata, 2017
 Selasia pallida Péringuey
 Selasia sabatinellii Kundrata, 2017
 Selasia socotrana Kundrata, 2012
 Selasia unicolor (Guérin-Méneville)

References

Elateridae